Eric Jackson was the 47th Mayor of Trenton, the capital of New Jersey, having assumed office on July 1, 2014 for a four-year term. In January 2018 he announced he would not seek re-election.

Background
Jackson was born and raised in Trenton. He attended public schools and the Hun School in Princeton. He received his degree in public administration at Fairleigh Dickinson University after which he worked for Citibank for seven years. He later became Director of Operations and Personnel for the nonprofit Henry J. Austin Center, a Trenton-based primary health care provider. Jackson worked for the City of Trenton including several policy and administrative positions, finally becoming the Director of Public Works. In September 2011, he took a job as director of the Department of Public Works and Urban Development in Plainfield, New Jersey but received a residency waiver so he could still live in Trenton.

Election
In 2010 ran for mayor and lost a run-off election by three votes to then-Councilman Manuel Segura for the chance to challenge the eventual winner, Tony F. Mack.

He won the run-off election of June 10, 2014. On June 17, the mayor-elect met with Governor Chris Christie who pledged his support and willingness to work with the incoming administration. Jackson was sworn in on July 1, 2014.

References 

1959 births
Living people
Mayors of Trenton, New Jersey
New Jersey Democrats
Fairleigh Dickinson University alumni
Hun School of Princeton alumni
African-American mayors in New Jersey
21st-century American politicians
21st-century African-American politicians
20th-century African-American people